Joseph Mead Mellan (9 July 1902–1982) was an English footballer who played in the Football League for Darlington, Gateshead and Torquay United.

References

1902 births
1982 deaths
English footballers
Association football defenders
English Football League players
Barrow A.F.C. players
Darlington F.C. players
Torquay United F.C. players
Jarrow F.C. players
North Shields F.C. players
Gateshead A.F.C. players